Mohelnice may refer to places in the Czech Republic:

 Mohelnice, a town in the Olomouc Region
 Mohelnice (Plzeň-South District), a municipality and village in the Plzeň Region
 Mohelnice, a village and administrative part of Křešín in the Vysočina Region